Aplexa hypnorum, or by the common name, the moss bladder snail, is a species of small air-breathing freshwater snail, an aquatic pulmonate gastropod mollusk in the family Physidae, a family which are sometimes known as the bladder snails.

As is true of all physids, the shell is sinistral, or left-handed. The species inhabits temporary water bodies and occurs in the Eurosiberian Boreo-temperate or possibly the Eurasian Boreo-temperate if East Siberia specimens are correctly identified. It may be Holarctic, again if North American specimens are correctly identified.

Distribution
 Belgium
 British Isles
 Czech Republic
 Slovakia
 Denmark
 Germany 
 Italy
 Netherlands
 Norway
 Poland

Habitat
This species inhabits very shallow ponds and ditches, usually ones that dry out periodically.

Shell description
The shell is translucent and pale brownish in color. It is elongate with a high spire and a narrow aperture. The maximum length of the shell is about 13 mm.

In contrast to the shell, the soft parts of the animal are black or dark grey. The tentacles are long and narrow.

Life habits
This is a surprisingly active and lively snail.

Although the animals themselves die when a temporary pond dries out, the eggs are extremely resistant to desiccation.

References

Further reading 
 Janus, Horst, 1965. "The young specialist looks at land and freshwater molluscs", Burke, London
 Adams A. & Adams H. (1858). The Genera of Recent Mollusca, J. Van Voorst, Plate LXXXIV, nr 2&2a.

External links
Aplexa hypnorum at Animalbase taxonomy, short description, distribution, biology, status (threats), images 
 Ecology 
 Older records, misidentifying Aplexa elongata as Aplexa hypnorum in Utah, United States 
 From Germany, with shell photo available 

Physidae
Gastropods described in 1758
Taxa named by Carl Linnaeus